The 1985 CECAFA Cup was the 13th edition of the tournament. It was held in Zimbabwe, and was won by Zimbabwe. The matches were played between October 4–13.

Group A
Played in Harare

Group B
Played in Bulawayo

Semi-finals

Third place match

Final

References
Rsssf archives

CECAFA Cup
CECAFA